The 1967 Six Hour Le Mans was an endurance motor race for Sports Cars and Touring Cars. The event, which attracted 38 starters, was staged at the Caversham Airfield circuit in Western Australia on 5 June 1967.

Results

Note : The above listing is incomplete.

References

Further reading
 Jim Shepherd, A History of Australian Motor Sport, 1980, p. 152
 Terry Walker, Around The Houses, 1980, pp. 58–59
 Dunkerton Drives Skilfully, The West Australian, Tuesday, 6 June 1967, p. 39

External links
Images from the race Retrieved from State Library of Western Australia on 18 March 2009

Six Hours Le Mans
Six Hours Le Mans